Jack Holt (4 August 1883 – 20 October 1921) was an Australian rules footballer who played with Fitzroy in the Victorian Football League (VFL).

Notes

External links 

1883 births
1921 deaths
Australian rules footballers from Melbourne
Fitzroy Football Club players
People from Clifton Hill, Victoria